Parallel universe often refers to parallel universes in fiction, a self-contained separate world, universe or reality coexisting with the real world, which is used as a recurring plot point or setting used in fantasy and science fiction.

Parallel universe may also refer to:

Science 
 The many-worlds interpretation of quantum mechanics, which implies the existence of parallel universes
 Multiverse, a group of multiple universes

Philosophy 
 Possible world, a construct in metaphysics to bring rigor to talk of logical possibility
 Modal realism, an account of possible worlds according to which they are all just as real as the actual world
 Extended modal realism, the view that all worlds, possible as well as impossible, are as real as the actual world

Arts and media
 Alternate history, a genre of fiction consisting of stories that are set in worlds in which historical events unfold differently from the real world
 Alternative universe (fan fiction), fiction by fan authors that deliberately alters universe written about
 List of fiction employing parallel universes

Literature, film, and television
 "Parallel Universe" (Red Dwarf), a 1988 episode of Red Dwarf
 Parallel Universes (film), a 2001 BBC/Horizon documentary film
 Mirror Universe (Star Trek), a fictional parallel universe in which several Star Trek television episodes take place

Music
 Parallel Universe (4hero album), the second album by the drum and bass group 4hero
 Parallel Universe (Garnet Crow album), the eighth studio album by Japanese group Garnet Crow
 Parallel Universe, the eighth studio album by American band Plain White T's
 "Parallel Universe" (song), a song by the Red Hot Chili Peppers on the 1999 album Californication
 Parallel Dimensions (album), a 2008 album by Perseo Miranda

See also
 Metaverse, a collective virtual shared space
 Alternate reality (disambiguation)
 Multiverse (disambiguation)
 Parallel World (disambiguation)